Esther Ralston (born Esther Louise Worth, September 17, 1902 – January 14, 1994) was an iconic American silent film star.  Her most prominent sound picture was To the Last Man in 1933.

Early life and career

Ralston was born Esther Louise Worth in Bar Harbor, Maine, one of five siblings. She was the older sister of actor Howard Ralston (July 25, 1904 – June 1, 1992), who appeared in nine films between 1920 and 1924.

She began her career as a child actress in a family vaudeville act which was billed as "The Ralston Family with Baby Esther, America's Youngest Juliet". From this, she appeared in a few small silent film roles, including a role alongside her brother in the 1920 film adaptation of Huckleberry Finn. Ralston later gained attention as Mrs. Darling in the 1924 film version of Peter Pan.

In the late 1920s, she appeared in many films for Paramount, at one point earning as much as $8,000 per week, and garnering much popularity, especially in United Kingdom. She appeared mainly in comedies usually with her name billed above the title, often portraying spirited society girls, and also received good reviews for her forays into dramatic roles.

On radio, Ralston portrayed Kathy Marsh in Portia Faces Life and Marcella Hudnall in Our Gal Sunday.

Retirement and later years

Despite making a successful transition to sound films, she mainly was relegated to supporting roles by the mid-1930s. Her last leading role was in To the Last Man in 1933, directed by Henry Hathaway and starring Randolph Scott with a supporting cast featuring Noah Beery Sr., Buster Crabbe, Shirley Temple and John Carradine. In his book, The Hollywood Western: Ninety Years of Cowboys and Indians, Train Robbers, Sheriffs and Gunslingers, film historian William K. Everson discusses the film, writing:To the Last Man was almost a model of its kind, an exceptionally strong story of feuding families in the post-Civil War era, with a cast worthy of an "A" feature, excellent direction by Henry Hathaway, and an unusual climactic fight between the villain (Jack LaRue) and the heroine (Esther Ralston, in an exceptionally appealing performance).

Ralston made her final film Tin Pan Alley in 1940 and chose to retire from films. She continued working on the stage and in radio throughout the 1940s, including being the leading lady for part of the run of Woman of Courage.

She returned to the screen in the early 1950s with guest roles on television series, including a Kraft Television Theatre version of Daphne Du Maurier's "September Tide" and an episode of Tales of Tomorrow titled "All the Time in the World." In 1962, she had a leading role in the short-lived daytime drama Our Five Daughters, her final onscreen role (all five of the actresses playing her daughters resembled Ralston in her heyday).

In 1985, Ralston released her autobiography Some Day We'll Laugh. In the book, she mentions that her career was sabotaged by Louis B. Mayer when she refused to sleep with him at the beginning of a swiftly abortive contract at his studio. She was graylisted and soon found herself toppled from the height of the industry to being predominantly relegated to supporting roles, mainly at minor studios, solving the mystery of why her career faltered at the dawn of sound despite her having had a lifetime of theatrical stage experience and a superb speaking voice.

Marriages
 On December 25, 1925, Ralston married her manager, actor George Webb Frey in Manhattan, New York. He was credited in films as George Webb. They had a daughter, Mary Esther (born 1931), who, at birth was known as the "$100,000 Baby" because her mother turned down a substantial film contract while pregnant. George and Esther divorced in 1934. George filed for bankruptcy in Los Angeles in March 1934.
 On June 16, 1935, Ralston married actor Will Morgan (Wilburt Whitfield Morgan), then a former New York stage actor and singer. They divorced in 1938. Morgan led the saxophone section for eight years for Fred Waring. 
 On August 6, 1939, Ralston married radio announcer and columnist Ted Lloyd (Theodore Allen Lloyd) in Greenwich, Connecticut. Music publisher Jack Robbins (John Jacob Robbins) was Lloyd's best man. The couple had two children, Judy and Ted, Jr. Ted and Esther divorced in 1954. Before marrying Ralston, Lloyd had worked for newspapers and Radio News. In 1942, Lloyd became director of radio for 20th Century Fox. In 1946, with Hal Horne and Armand Deutsch, Lloyd formed Ted Lloyd, Inc. to manage personalities and to produce radio (later TV) programs. He produced several radio dramas, including My True Story for the NBC Red Network, Adventures of the Abbotts on NBC Red Network (18 episodes in 1955), Whispering Streets for CBS Radio, and Escape for CBS-TV.

Death
On January 14, 1994, Ralston died of a heart attack at age 91 in her home in Ventura, California. The family held services on January 17, 1994, in Ventura, California, the day of the Northridge earthquake. 

For her contribution to the motion picture industry, Esther Ralston had a star on the Hollywood Walk of Fame at 6664 Hollywood Boulevard.

Filmography

References

Notes

Citations

Sources 

 Speaking of Silents: First Ladies of the Screen, by William H. Drew, Vestal Press (1989); 
 Some Day We'll Laugh: An Autobiography, by Esther Ralston, Anthony Slide (ed.), Scarecrow Press (1985);

External links

Photographs of Esther Ralston

1902 births
1994 deaths
20th-century American actresses
Actresses from Maine
American child actresses
American film actresses
20th-century American memoirists
American radio actresses
American silent film actresses
American stage actresses
American television actresses
People from Bar Harbor, Maine
Vaudeville performers
American women memoirists
Writers from Maine